Pape Badiane (10 February 1980 – 23 December 2016) was a French professional basketball player who played 23 times for the men's French national basketball team between 2007 and 2008. He died on 23 December 2016 in a traffic accident.

After a career that included stops in the NCAA with Cleveland State (2000–2003), and a return to France where he played in Pro A with Roanne, Le Mans and Poitiers, he played in the third French division. He was a member of the French national team in Eurobasket 2007 and a member of Roanne in the Euroleague.

He won the French title with Roanne in 2007. He also won the French Cup in 2009, the Semaine des As in both 2007 and 2009, and was selected three times in the French All Star Game (2006, 2007, 2009).

His younger brother, Moussa Badiane, is also a professional basketball player.

References

External links
LNB profile

1980 births
2016 deaths
Black French sportspeople
Chorale Roanne Basket players
Cleveland State Vikings men's basketball players
French expatriate basketball people in the United States
French men's basketball players
Le Mans Sarthe Basket players
Poitiers Basket 86 players
Power forwards (basketball)
Road incident deaths in France
Sportspeople from Boulogne-Billancourt